Georg von Siemens (21 October 1839 – 23 October 1901) was a German banker and liberal politician.

Georg von Siemens was on the board of directors of the Deutsche Bank from 1870 to 1900. One of his top priorities was the financing of international railway projects, including the Northern Pacific, and the Baghdad Railway.

From 1874 until his death, he was voted several times to both the Prussian House of Representatives and the German Reichstag. Until 1880, he represented the National Liberal Party, then the Secession, from 1884 to 1893 the German Free-minded Party, and for the last years the Free-minded Union.

Background 
Georg von Siemens was born on 21 October 1839 to judicial officer Johann Siemens and Marie Siemens (née von Sperl) in Torgau. Siemens was a nephew of industrialists Werner von Siemens, William, and Carl von Siemens.  His father provided most of the funds of the later Siemens AG.

In 1857, Siemens began studying law in Heidelberg just before beginning his one-year military service in Berlin in 1858. After passing his state examination in 1860, Siemens worked as a clerk for the district courts in Jüterbog and Zossen. After transferring to Aachen in 1866, Siemens began advising the company of Werner Siemens, his cousin, Siemens, Halske & Co. before being drafted into the Rhenish Infantry Regiment for the German War. Siemens became the state examiner for Aachen later that year.

Establishment of the Indo-European Telegraph Company and Deutsche Bank 
In 1867, Georg von Siemens established the Indo-European Telegraph Company in London on behalf of Werner Siemens. From 1868 to 1870, Siemens worked for the Indo-European Telegraph Company in Tehran, mediating between the British and Persian governments to secure Siemens, Halske & Co. the rights to income from the telegraph traffic.

In 1870, Siemens returned to Berlin and participated in the founding of Deutsche Bank. In April of that year, Siemens became the director of Deutsche Bank before being commissioned as a lieutenant of the 4th Brandenburg Infantry Regiment for the Franco-German War.

From 1872 to 1874, Siemens led the establishment of Deutsche Bank in London, Paris, New York City, Argentina, Uruguay, Shanghai, and Yokohama. The branches in Argentina, Uruguay, Shanghai, and Yokohama were later liquidated due to financial trouble.

References

External links
 

1839 births
1901 deaths
People from Torgau
People from the Province of Saxony
Georg
German Protestants
National Liberal Party (Germany) politicians
German Free-minded Party politicians
Free-minded Union politicians
Members of the 2nd Reichstag of the German Empire
Members of the 6th Reichstag of the German Empire
Members of the 7th Reichstag of the German Empire
Members of the 8th Reichstag of the German Empire
Members of the 10th Reichstag of the German Empire
Members of the Prussian House of Representatives
German bankers
Deutsche Bank people